Jasse Jalonen (born 18 July 1973) is a Finnish former professional footballer who played the position of midfielder. He is a former member of the Finland national football team.

External links
 

1973 births
Living people
Turun Palloseura footballers
Myllykosken Pallo −47 players
FC Flora players
Vaasan Palloseura players
Expatriate footballers in Estonia
Finnish footballers
Finland international footballers
Footballers from Turku
Association football midfielders
Meistriliiga players
Finnish expatriate footballers
Finnish expatriate sportspeople in Estonia